Quezaltepeque is a volcanic field in Chiquimula, Guatemala. It has erupted in the Holocene. It is an area of basaltic lava flows was erupted from vents along a north–south trending fault without explosions, cutting through Tertiary pyroclastic rocks WNW of Ipala volcano about 5 km south of Quezaltepeque town. These basaltic flows issued passively from vents along a N-S-trending fault without accompanying explosive activity. There are mounds of lava over the vents.

References 

Volcanoes of Guatemala